

See also
Media in Canada

Northwest Territories
Television stations